The 2008 Calgary Stampeders season was the 51st season for the team in the Canadian Football League and their 70th overall. The Stampeders finished in 1st place in the West division, won the West Final and played in the 96th Grey Cup in Montreal. The Stampeders defeated the hometown Montreal Alouettes to win their 6th Grey Cup championship.

Offseason

Transactions
April 24, 2008 – Montreal native Kevin Challenger signed with the Calgary Stampeders on Friday April 25. The former Boston College star was eligible for the NFL Draft but Challenger was ranked number 108 among NCAA receivers. Challenger spent five years at Boston College and was a starter the 2006 and 2007 seasons.
May 27, 2008 – Calgary Stampeders head coach/GM John Hufnagel traded Duncan Mahony to the Edmonton Eskimos. Calgary received a conditional draft pick for the 31-year-old O'Mahony.

CFL draft
In the 2008 CFL Draft, 48 players were chosen from among 752 eligible players from Canadian universities across the country, as well as Canadian players playing in the NCAA. The first two rounds were broadcast on TSN.ca with host Rod Black.

Preseason

Regular season

Season standings

Season schedule

Roster

Player stats

Passing

Rushing

Receiving

Awards and records
Henry Burris, Led West Division, Passing Touchdowns (39)
Henry Burris, Led West Division, Passer Rating (103.8)
Joffrey Reynolds, CFL Rushing Champion, 1310 Yards
Joffrey Reynolds, Led CFL, Rushing Attempts (227)
John Hufnagel, Annis Stukus Trophy winner as the CFL's coach of the year.

All-Star Selections
Brandon Browner, Western Division All-Star, Defence
Henry Burris, Western Division All-Star, Offence
Sandro DeAngelis, Western Division All-Star, Special Teams
Rob Lazeo, Western Division All-Star, Offence
Ken-Yon Rambo, Western Division All-Star, Offence
Joffrey Reynolds, Western Division All-Star, Offence

Playoffs

West Final
Date and time: Saturday, November 15, 2:30 PM Mountain Standard TimeVenue: McMahon Stadium, Calgary, Alberta

Grey Cup
Date and time: Sunday, November 23, 4:00 PM Mountain Standard TimeVenue: Olympic Stadium, Montreal, Quebec

References

Calgary Stampeders
Grey Cup championship seasons
Calgary Stampeders seasons
2008 in Alberta